Red Deer County is a municipal district in central Alberta, Canada within Census Division No. 8 and surrounding the City of Red Deer. The neighbouring municipalities of Red Deer County are Clearwater County to the west, Lacombe County to the north, the County of Stettler No. 6 to the east, Kneehill County to the southeast and Mountain View County to the south. It is located approximately midway between Edmonton and Calgary, bisected by the Queen Elizabeth II Highway and bounded on the north and east by the Red Deer River.

Geography

Communities and localities 
The following urban municipalities are surrounded by Red Deer County.
Cities
Red Deer
Towns
Bowden
Innisfail
Penhold
Sylvan Lake
Villages
Delburne
Elnora
Summer villages
Jarvis Bay
Norglenwold

The following hamlets are located within Red Deer County.
Hamlets
Ardley
Benalto
Dickson
Gasoline Alley
Linn Valley
Lousana
Markerville
Springbrook
Spruce View

The following localities are located within Red Deer County.
Localities 

Balmoral
Balmoral NW (designated place)
Balmoral SE (designated place)
Bouteiller Subdivision or Boutellier Subdivision
Briggs
Broderson Subdivision or Brodersons Subdivision
Brownlee Acreage
Burnt Lake
Canyon Heights (designated place)
Central Park (designated place)
Coalbanks
Cygnet
Doan
Elspeth

Evarts
Fleming
Garrington
Garrington Acres
Gleniffer
Green Ridge Park
Half Moon Bay
Harrison
Henday
Herder (designated place)
High Ridge Properties
Hillsdown
Horseshoe Lake
Kevisville

Knee Hill Valley
Kountry Meadows (designated place) or Kountry Meadow Estates
Kuusamo
Les Trailer Park (designated place)
McKenzie Subdivision
Melody Meadows Trailer Park
Milnerton
Mintlaw
Mountain House
New Hill
Niobe
Nisbet
Pine Lake

Poplar Ridge or Poplar Ridge Subdivision
Prevo
Raven
Red Deer Junction
Ridgewood Terrace
Riverview Park
Shady Pine Trailer Park
South Park Village
Spruce Lane Acres (designated place)
Trueman Subdivision
Tuttle
West Ridge Estates
Wild Rose
Woodland Hills (designated place)

Business Parks
The following are business parks located within Red Deer County:

Belich Business Park
Blindman Industrial Park
Burnt Lake Business Park

Clearview Industrial Park
Energy Business Park
Gasoline Alley Business Park

Kuusomo Industrial Park
McKenzie Industrial Business Park
Petrolia Business Park

Piper Creek Business Park
Red Deer Industrial Park

Demographics 

In the 2016 Census of Population conducted by Statistics Canada, Red Deer County had a population of 19,541 living in 7,097 of its 8,440 total private dwellings, a  change from its 2011 population of 18,316.

Economy 

Agriculture plays a role in Red Deer County's economy including livestock and crop production. Red Deer County has dairies that make cheese, U-pick vegetable and fruit farms, and the largest organic farm in Alberta. It also has elk, deer, and apiary farms as well as a mouse farm, which raises white mice for the pet food industry. Lumber and mineral resources are also present in Red Deer County.

See also 
List of communities in Alberta
List of municipal districts in Alberta

References

External links 

 
Municipal districts in Alberta